Kite flying was on the Summer Olympic Games programme in 1900. These events have generally not been classified as official, although the IOC has never decided which events were "Olympic" and which were not.

See also
 1900 Summer Olympics
 Kite flying

References

Olympics
Discontinued sports at the Summer Olympics
1900 Summer Olympics events